Marquis Classics is a Canadian record label, founded in 1981 by Earl Rosen.  The company is based in Toronto and owned by Rosen and Dinah Hoyle.

Marquis specializes in Jazz and Classical recordings. The label's recordings are distributed in North America by Entertainment One Music Distribution.

Marquis Classics distributes re-issues of a number of reissued 1960s and 1970s releases from the independent label Orion Master Recordings.

List of Marquis Artists 

 Amanda Forsyth
 Catherine Manoukian
 Christina Petrowska-Quilico
 Donald Patriquin
 Leonard Hokanson
 Manhattan Piano Trio
 Patricia O'Callaghan
 Poulenc Trio
 Trevor Pinnock
 Yevgeny Kutik

External links 
 Marquis Classics website

References 

Record labels established in 1981
Canadian independent record labels